The 2023 All Stars match  was the 12th annual representative exhibition All Stars match of Australian rugby league. The match was played between the Indigenous All Stars and the Māori All Stars at Rotorua International Stadium on 11 February 2023, marking the first occasion the All Stars fixture was played outside of Australia. 

For the second time since the introduction of the All Stars concept, the teams were not selected through public voting.

Men's All Stars match

Teams 
For the Indigenous team, Ronald Griffiths took over as head coach from Laurie Daley, who had held the position since 2011. The initial squads were announced on 25 January 2023, with the final teams confirmed on 7 February 2023.

A number of players withdrew from the original squads:
 Māori All Stars
 Daejarn Asi
 Nelson Asofa-Solomona
 Joseph Manu
 Starford To'a
 Jared Waerea-Hargreaves
 Dylan Walker
 Dallin Watene-Zelezniak
 Indigenous All Stars
 Josh Addo-Carr
 Ezra Mam
 Chris Smith
 Will Smith

Result

Women's All Stars match

Teams 
Kennedy Cherrington was a late withdrawal from the Māori All Stars after suffering a hand injury. Caitlan Johnston and Tallisha Harden also withdrew from the Indigenous All Stars squad.

Result

References 

2023 NRL season
Rugby league in New Zealand
NRL All Stars match